The following lists events that happened during 2001 in Laos.

Incumbents
President: Khamtai Siphandon
Vice President: Choummaly Sayasone
Prime Minister: Sisavath Keobounphanh (until 27 March), Bounnhang Vorachith (starting 27 March)

Events
Date unknown - 2001 Lao League

 
Years of the 21st century in Laos
Laos
2000s in Laos
Laos